Tommi were a short-lived British girl group formed in 2003. They only released one single, "Like What" which reached number 12 on the UK Singles Chart and number 38 in Ireland.

Discography

Singles
"Like What" - #12 UK, #38 Ireland

References

Musical groups established in 2003
English pop music groups
English girl groups
British hip hop girl groups
British pop girl groups
Sony Music UK artists